"Get Buck" is the second single off American rapper Young Buck's second album, Buck the World. It was released on February 13, 2007 through G-Unit Records. The track was produced by Polow da Don. It was the only track off the album to chart on the Billboard Hot 100, peaking at #87.

The beat for this song was used on Ludacris' "Politics As Usual".

A clip of the instrumental version of "Get Buck" was used in a 2017 Budweiser TV commercial.

Music video
The music video features cameos by DJ Drama, Young Jeezy, E-40, Young Dro, Rich Boy, Gorilla Zoe, Jody Breeze, Ace Hood, Polow da Don, Young Noble & E.D.I. of Outlawz as well as fellow G-Unit Records members Lloyd Banks, Lil Scrappy, Tony Yayo, Young Hot Rod & Spider Loc.

Charts

References

External links 
 

2007 singles
2007 songs
Young Buck songs
Song recordings produced by Polow da Don
Songs written by Polow da Don
Songs written by Attitude (rapper)
Songs written by Young Buck
Songs written by Blac Elvis
G-Unit Records singles
Gangsta rap songs